Herøy is a municipality in Møre og Romsdal county, Norway. It is part of the Sunnmøre region. The administrative centre is the town of Fosnavåg on the island of Bergsøya. The industrial area of Eggesbønes is located south of Fosnavåg on the same island. The Runde Environmental Centre is located in the northern part of the municipality on Runde island. Other population centres in Herøy include the villages of Leikong, Kvalsund, or Moltustranda.

The  municipality is the 320th largest by area out of the 356 municipalities in Norway. Herøy is the 123rd most populous municipality in Norway with a population of 8,765.

General information
The prestegjeld (parish) of Herøy was established as a municipality on 1 January 1838 (see formannskapsdistrikt law). On 1 January 1867, the western district of Herøy was separated to become the new Sande Municipality. This left Herøy municipality with 1,999 residents. On 1 January 1873, an area of Sande (population: 362) was transferred back to Herøy. On 1 January 1889, the Eiksund area and Ekø island (population: 119) were transferred from Sande to Herøy.

During the 1960s, there were many municipal mergers across Norway due to the work of the Schei Committee. On 1 January 1964, three farms in the Gurskedalen valley (population: 25) were transferred from Herøy to Sande. Also on that date, the Eiksund area and the Eika island (population: 222) were transferred from Herøy to neighboring Ulstein Municipality.

Name
The municipality (originally the parish) is named after an archipelago of small islands. The first element is herr which means "army" (here in the sense skipaherr which means "military fleet") and the last element is the plural form of øy which means "island". Before 1918, the name was written Herø.

Coat of arms
The coat of arms was granted on 27 March 1987. The arms show two silver or white stems of a ship on a blue background. This design was chosen to represent the 7th century Kvalsund boats found in the municipality.

Churches
The Church of Norway has three parishes within the municipality of Herøy. It is part of the Søre Sunnmøre prosti (deanery) in the Diocese of Møre.

Government
All municipalities in Norway, including Herøy, are responsible for primary education (through 10th grade), outpatient health services, senior citizen services, unemployment and other social services, zoning, economic development, and municipal roads. The municipality is governed by a municipal council of elected representatives, which in turn elect a mayor. The municipality falls under the Møre og Romsdal District Court and the Frostating Court of Appeal.

Municipal council
The municipal council of Herøy is made up of 33 representatives that are elected to four year terms. The party breakdown of the council is as follows:

Mayor
The mayors of Herøy (incomplete list):
2019–present: Bjørn-Halvor Prytz (Ap)
2003-2019: Arnulf Goksøyr (H)
1999-2003: Svein Gjelseth (Ap)
1995-1999: Leif G. Igesund (KrF)
1989-1995: Svein Gjelseth (Ap)
1988-1989: Per Rolf Sævik (KrF)
1980-1987: Charles Remø (H)

Geography

The main population and administrative centre of the municipality is the town of Fosnavåg, located on the island of Bergsøya. The municipality is entirely composed of islands located north of the Rovdefjorden. It includes the main islands of Bergsøya, Leinøya, Nerlandsøya, Remøya, Runde, Skorpa, Flåvær, and the eastern part of Gurskøya, plus many smaller islands. The island of Runde is especially notable for its large seabird colonies (and Runde Lighthouse), while Skorpa is famous for its role as a station for the Shetland bus. The islands are connected together via a series of bridges including the Runde Bridge, Remøy Bridge, Herøy Bridge, and Nerlandsøy Bridge.

The Herøyfjorden bisects Herøy municipality. The half located south of the fjord is referred to as Inner Herøy, while the half located north of the fjord is referred to as Outer Herøy. Inner and Outer Herøy are tied together by the Herøy Bridge which connects the islands of Gurskøy and Leinøya. Along this main route of traffic is the islet Notøy and the even smaller Herøya islet, an old trading station (now museum) and the original location of the original Herøy Church.

The fishing station Flåvær is located on a group of islets and skerries in the Herøyfjord,  It includes the islets Flåvær, Husholmen, Torvholmen and Varholmen. The Flåvær Lighthouse is located on Varholmen.

Notable people 
 Hans Peter L'orange (1835 in Herøy – 1907) military officer, the Commanding General in Norway, 1897 to 1903
 Suzannah Ibsen (1836 in Herøy – 1914) the wife of playwright and poet Henrik Ibsen
 Aage Skavlan (1847 in Herøy – 1920) a Norwegian historian and academic
 Harald Skavlan (1854 in Herøy – 1908) a Norwegian railroad engineer
 Johannes A. Bøe (1882 at Bøe in Herøy – 1970) a Norwegian politician; Mayor of Jevnaker, 1922 to 1925
 Per Rolf Sævik  (born 1940 in Herøy) a fisherman, ship-owner and politician; Mayor of Herøy, 1987 to 1989
 Synnøve Eriksen (born 1963 in Herøy) a Norwegian novelist

References

External links
Municipal fact sheet from Statistics Norway 
The Bird Island of Runde 
Herøy Kommune 

 
Sunnmøre
Municipalities of Møre og Romsdal
1838 establishments in Norway